The Novelletten, Op. 21, is a set of eight pieces for solo piano, written by Robert Schumann in 1838. This composition is dedicated to Adolf von Henselt.

Background

The Novelletten were composed during February 1838, a period of great struggle for the composer. Schumann originally intended the eight pieces to be performed together as a group, though they are often performed separately.

This set of pieces is an excellent example of Schumann's keyboard style.

Analysis

No. 1 in F major

Markiert und kräftig (Marked and strong)

This piece contains seven sections, alternating between a staccato march and flowing legato passages. The piece is a modified Rondo form.

No. 2 in D major

Äußerst rasch und mit Bravour (Extremely fast and with bravura)

This virtuosic piece is graceful and effective. An Intermezzo section in the middle contrasts and varies the piece.

No. 3 in D major

Leicht und mit Humor (Light and with humor)

This piece displays the composer's sense of humour through the use of rapid staccato chords. An Intermezzo section in the middle of the piece is used to contrast.

No. 4 in D major

Ballmässig. Sehr munter (Ball-like. Very lively)

This piece is quite loosely organized in terms of structure; it is an interesting waltz that uses cross-rhythms and syncopation effectively.

No. 5 in D major

Rauschend und festlich (Glittering and festive)

This piece is in the form of a polonaise; its principal section contains three main ideas which are then overcome by the persistent rhythms of the Trio section.

No. 6 in A major

Sehr lebhaft, mit vielem Humor (Very lively, with much humor)

This piece uses an increasing tempo to characterize the progression of sections. Starting from the staccato opening, each of the following passages are marked a few metronome beats faster until the coda, which returns to the original tempo.

No. 7 in E major

Äusserst rasch (Extremely fast)

This piece features a beautiful and lyrical middle section; it also features many virtuosic passages containing fast, brilliant octaves.

No. 8 in F minor

Sehr lebhaft (Very lively)

The concluding piece of the set is actually two pieces in one. The first part is a passionate étude in 2/4, the second has the nature of a march. It ends in D major, the principal key of the cycle.

References

Further reading
Liner notes by Misha Donat, 2014 Hyperion Records recording by Danny Driver

External links

, Dino Ciani
, Tim Burnelis

Piano music by Robert Schumann
1838 compositions
Compositions for solo piano
Music dedicated to ensembles or performers